Tropical Storm Chantal was a significant tropical storm that brought strong winds and heavy rainfall to the Lesser Antilles and Hispaniola in July 2013. The third tropical depression, and the third tropical storm of the 2013 Atlantic hurricane season, Chantal originated from a tropical wave off the coast of Africa on July 4. By July 7, the wave had strengthened into a tropical storm, and had been named Chantal. On July 10, an aircraft flew into the system and could not find a well-defined center. On July 12, it degenerated into an open wave. 

Overall, the storm caused at least $10 million (2013 USD) in damage. Minimal damage from the storm was reported in the Dominican Republic and the Lesser Antilles.

Meteorological history 

A large tropical wave moved off the west coast of Africa on July 4. By July 5, the storm produced a small but distinct cyclonic circulation around several hundred miles south of the Cape Verde Islands. On July 6, a kelvin wave had passed through the wave, creating more favorable atmospheric conditions for it. Most of the tropical storm force-winds were in a small area in the north-eastern quadrant of the storm.  

Chantal then rapidly moved to the south of a strong subtropical ridge, exposing the northern or north-eastern side of the center because of wind shear. Despite this, the wind shear was not strong enough to stop Chantal from strengthening. Late on July 8 and early on July 9, Chantal sped into an area with more wind shear, and the cloud pattern of the cyclone because disorganized. On July 10, an Air Force Reserve hurricane hunter aircraft flew into the system, and could not locate a circulation center, which may of been because the circulation was small and moving faster than expected.

Deep convection later diminished, especially north and east of the center, however, the storm started to re-develop just prior to 12:00 UTC on July 10. Despite this, the cloud pattern was still disorganized, and the storm degenerated into an open wave as it continued to move closer to Hispaniola late that morning. The remnants then moved north-west over eastern Cuba, before tracking over the south, central, and northern Bahamas on July 12. The remnants later became untrackable over the western Atlantic, to the northeast of the Bahamas.

Preparations and impacts 
Tropical storm warnings and watches were placed over many islands in the Lesser Antilles in preparation for the storm. Damage was estimated by Aon Benfield Inc. at $10 million (2013 USD).

Lesser Antilles 
In Dominica, airports and the countries ferry service were closed down, while in Saint Lucia, two airports shut down and the government ordered all schools a midday closure, not opening up until the next day.

On Martinique, a peak wind gust of 76 mph (122 km/h) was reported. Numerous homes had their roofs torn off in Dominica.

Dominican Republic
A tropical storm warning was issued for most of the coast, while a hurricane watch was issued from Barahona to Samana. Chantal produced a 2–4 foot (0.6–1.2 meter) storm surge in the Dominican Republic, accompanied by dangerous waves. A firefighter in Maimón was killed as he was swept away by floodwaters while attempting to clear a clogged storm drain.

See also 

Tropical cyclones in 2013
Hurricane Iris (2001) — Took a similar track across the eastern Caribbean
Tropical Storm Bonnie (2004) - Took a similar track through the Lesser Antilles
Tropical Storm Erika (2015) - Took a similar track

References

External links 

Chantal
Chantal
2013 in the Caribbean